Spodnje Palovče (in older sources also Spodnje Paloviče) is a settlement in the hills east of Kamnik in the Upper Carniola region of Slovenia.

References

External links

Spodnje Palovče on Geopedia

Populated places in the Municipality of Kamnik